is a horse racing track in Hakodate, Japan, built in 1896. During the period between 2008 and 2009, Hakodate Racecourse was closed for renovation and refurbishment of the grandstand. Work was completed in June 2010. As part of this refurbishment, Mitsubishi Electric installed a Diamond Vision Screen. Races that were supposed to be held at Hakodate during that period were moved to Sapporo Racecourse. Hakodate Racecourse has both a grass course, and a dirt course.

Physical attributes

Main Turf Course
1000m, 1200m, 1700m, 1800m, 2000m, and 2600m races are run on the Main turf Course.

Dirt Course
1000m, 1700m, and 2400m races run on the dirt oval.

Notable races

References

Track lengths from japanracing.jp

Horse racing venues in Japan
Sports venues in Hokkaido
Buildings and structures in Hakodate
Sports venues completed in 1896
1896 establishments in Japan